Vestalis is a genus of damselflies belonging to the family Calopterygidae.

The genus contains the following species:
Vestalis amabilis 
Vestalis amaryllis 
Vestalis amethystina  – Forest Damselfly
Vestalis amnicola 
Vestalis amoena  – Metallic Green Demoiselle, Charming Flashwing
Vestalis anacolosa 
Vestalis anne 
Vestalis apicalis 
Vestalis atropha 
Vestalis beryllae 
Vestalis gracilis  – Clear-winged Forest Glory
Vestalis luctuosa 
Vestalis lugens 
Vestalis melania 
Vestalis submontana 
Vestalis yunosukei

References

Calopterygidae
Zygoptera genera
Taxa named by Edmond de Sélys Longchamps